The 2014 FC Edmonton season was the club's fourth season in North American Soccer League, the second division of the Canadian soccer pyramid.

Background

Review

Competitions

Pre-season and Exhibitions

Pre-season

Exhibitions

NASL Spring Season 

The Spring season lasted for 9 games beginning on April 12 and ending on June 8.  The schedule would feature a single round robin format with each team playing every other team in the league a single time.  Half the teams would host 5 home games and play 4 road games whereas the other half of the teams would play 4 home games and 5 road games.

Standings

Results

Results by round 

All times listed using Mountain Time Zone.

Match reports

NASL Fall Season 

The Fall season will last for 18 games beginning on July 12 and ending on November 1.  The schedule will feature a double round robin format with each team playing every other team in the league twice, one at home and one on the road.  The winner of the Fall season will play the winner of the Spring season in the Soccer Bowl 2014 Championship game except if the Spring and Fall Champions are the same team in which case the team with the best overall Spring and Fall record behind that team will be their opponent.

Standings

Results

Results by round

Match reports

Canadian Championship

Preliminary round

Semifinals

Player details
List of squad players, including number of appearances by competition

|}

Transfers

In

Out

References 

FC Edmonton seasons
Edmonton
Fc Edmonton
2014 in Alberta